The Schreder HP-12A is an American homebuilt, mid-wing, V tailed, single-seat glider that was assembled out of various components all designed by Richard Schreder.

The aircraft is often confused with a completely different aircraft, the Schreder HP-12.

Design and development
The first HP-12A (HP stands for high performance) was built by a series of amateur sailplane builders, each contributing to the construction. It started off with Art Heabener of New Jersey constructing a rear fuselage from the plans for the original HP-12. The incomplete aircraft was then purchased by Tom Hall of Florida who built a set of HP-14 wings for it and then moved the incomplete aircraft to California and later to Illinois. It was in Illinois that Hall sold the still-incomplete aircraft to Rudy Kunda and Bill Carlson in 1977. They completed the aircraft in 1978.

The finished aircraft retains the HP-12 rear fuselage and HP-14 wings and has added an HP-18 V-tail and the forward fuselage from an HP-10. Kunda indicated that he does not know why the Federal Aviation Administration identifies it as an HP-12A, but it is a 100% Schreder design.

Operational history
In April 2011 the FAA registry listed three HP-12As.

Specifications (HP-12A)

See also

References

1960s United States sailplanes
Schreder aircraft
Aircraft first flown in 1965
V-tail aircraft